The Muslim Society of Washington, DC, Inc. (MSW) is a non-profit 501(c)3 organization founded to promote Islamic values.

Its president is Imam Johari Abdul-Malik, the outreach director for the Dar Al Hijrah Islamic Center in Northern Virginia.

References

Islamic charities based in the United States
Islamic political organizations